Baryonyx is a genus of theropod dinosaur which lived in the Barremian stage of the Early Cretaceous period, about 130–125 million years ago. The first skeleton was discovered in 1983 in the Smokejack Clay Pit, of Surrey, England, in sediments of the Weald Clay Formation, and became the holotype specimen of Baryonyx walkeri, named by palaeontologists Alan J. Charig and Angela C. Milner in 1986. The generic name, Baryonyx, means "heavy claw" and alludes to the animal's very large claw on the first finger; the specific name, walkeri, refers to its discoverer, amateur fossil collector William J. Walker. The holotype specimen is one of the most complete theropod skeletons from the UK (and remains the most complete Spinosaurid), and its discovery attracted media attention. Specimens later discovered in other parts of the United Kingdom and Iberia have also been assigned to the genus, though many have since been moved to new genera.

Baryonyx had a long, low, and narrow snout, which has been compared to that of a gharial. The tip of the snout expanded to the sides in the shape of a rosette. Behind this, the upper jaw had a notch which fitted into the lower jaw (which curved upwards in the same area). It had a triangular crest on the top of its nasal bones. Baryonyx had a large number of finely serrated, conical teeth, with the largest teeth in front. The neck formed an S-shape, and the neural spines of its dorsal vertebrae increased in height from front to back. One elongated neural spine indicates it may have had a hump or ridge along the centre of its back.

Now recognised as a member of the family Spinosauridae, Baryonyx affinities were obscure when it was discovered. Some researchers have suggested that Suchosaurus cultridens is a senior synonym (being an older name), and that Suchomimus tenerensis belongs in the same genus; subsequent authors have kept them separate. Baryonyx was the first theropod dinosaur demonstrated to have been piscivorous (fish-eating), as evidenced by fish scales in the stomach region of the holotype specimen. It may also have been an active predator of larger prey and a scavenger, since it also contained bones of a juvenile iguanodontid. The creature would have caught and processed its prey primarily with its forelimbs and large claws. Baryonyx may have had semiaquatic habits, and coexisted with other theropod, ornithopod, and sauropod dinosaurs, as well as pterosaurs, crocodiles, turtles and fishes, in a fluvial environment.

History of discovery

In January 1983, the British plumber and amateur fossil collector William J. Walker explored the Smokejacks Pit, a clay pit in the Weald Clay Formation near Ockley in Surrey, England. He found a rock wherein he discovered a large claw, but after piecing it together at home, he realised the tip of the claw was missing. Walker returned to the same spot in the pit some weeks later, and found the missing part after searching for an hour. Walker's son-in-law later brought the claw to the Natural History Museum of London, where it was examined by the British palaeontologists Alan J. Charig and Angela C. Milner, who identified it as belonging to a theropod dinosaur. The palaeontologists found more bone fragments at the site in February, but the entire skeleton could not be collected until May and June due to weather conditions at the pit. A team of eight museum staff members and several volunteers excavated  of rock matrix in 54 blocks over a three-week period. Walker donated the claw to the museum, and the Ockley Brick Company (owners of the pit) donated the rest of the skeleton and provided equipment. The area had been explored for 200 years, but no similar remains had been found before.

Most of the bones collected were encased in siltstone nodules surrounded by fine sand and silt, with the rest lying in clay. The position of some bones was disturbed by a bulldozer, and some were broken by mechanical equipment before they were collected. Preparing the specimen was difficult, due to the hardness of the siltstone matrix and the presence of siderite; acid preparation was attempted, but most of the matrix was removed mechanically. It took six years of almost constant preparation to get all the bones out of the rock, and by the end, dental tools and air mallets had to be used under a microscope. The original specimen number was BMNH R9951, but it was later re-catalogued as NHMUK VP R9951.

In 1986, Charig and Milner named a new genus and species with the skeleton as holotype specimen: Baryonyx walkeri. The generic name derives from ancient Greek; βαρύς (barys) means "heavy" or "strong", and ὄνυξ (onyx) means "claw" or "talon". The specific name honours Walker, for discovering the specimen. At that time, the authors did not know if the large claw belonged to the hand or the foot (as in dromaeosaurs, which it was then assumed to be). The dinosaur had been presented earlier the same year during a lecture at a conference about dinosaur systematics in Drumheller, Canada. Due to ongoing work on the bones (70 percent had been prepared at the time), they called their article preliminary and promised a more detailed description at a later date. Baryonyx was the first large Early Cretaceous theropod found anywhere in the world by that time. Before the discovery of Baryonyx the last significant theropod find in the United Kingdom was Eustreptospondylus in 1871, and in a 1986 interview Charig called Baryonyx "the best find of the century" in Europe. Baryonyx was widely featured in international media, and was nicknamed "Claws" by journalists punning on the title of the film Jaws. Its discovery was the subject of a 1987 BBC documentary, and a cast of the skeleton is mounted at the Natural History Museum in London. In 1997, Charig and Milner published a monograph describing the holotype skeleton in detail. The holotype specimen remains the most completely known spinosaurid skeleton.

Additional specimens
Fossils from other parts of the UK and Iberia, mostly isolated teeth, have subsequently been attributed to Baryonyx or similar animals. Isolated teeth and bones from the Isle of Wight, including hand bones reported in 1998 and a vertebra reported by the British palaeontologists Steve Hutt and Penny Newbery in 2004, have been attributed to this genus. A maxilla fragment from La Rioja, Spain, was attributed to Baryonyx by the Spanish palaeontologists Luis I. Viera and José Angel Torres in 1995 (although the American palaeontologist Thomas R. Holtz and colleagues raised the possibility that it could have belonged to Suchomimus in 2004). In 1999, a postorbital, tooth, vertebral remains,  (hand bones), and a phalanx from the Salas de los Infantes deposit in Burgos Province, Spain, were attributed to an immature Baryonyx (though some of these elements are unknown in the holotype) by the Spanish palaeontologist Carolina Fuentes Vidarte and colleagues. Dinosaur tracks near Burgos have also been suggested to belong to Baryonyx or a similar theropod.

 
In 2011, a specimen (Catalogued as ML1190 in Museu da Lourinhã) from the Papo Seco Formation in Boca do Chapim, Portugal, with a fragmentary dentary, teeth, vertebrae, ribs, hip bones, a scapula, and a phalanx bone, was attributed to Baryonyx by the Portuguese palaeontologist Octávio Mateus and colleagues, the most complete Iberian remains of the animal. The skeletal elements of this specimen are also represented in the more complete holotype (which was of similar size), except for the mid-neck vertebrae. In 2018, the British palaeontologist Thomas M. S. Arden and colleagues found that the Portuguese skeleton did not belong to Baryonyx, since the front of its dentary bone was not strongly upturned. This specimen was made the basis of the new genus Iberospinus by Mateus and Darío Estraviz-López in 2022. Some additional spinosaurid remains from Iberia may belong to taxa other than Baryonyx, including Vallibonavenatrix from Morella. 

In 2021, the British palaeontologist Chris T. Barker and colleagues described two new spinosaurid genera from the Wessex Formation of the Isle of Wight, Ceratosuchops and Riparovenator (the latter named R. milnerae honouring Milner for her contributions to spinosaurid research), and stated that spinosaurid material from there that had previously been attributed to the contemporary Baryonyx could have belonged to other taxa instead. These specimens had previously been assigned to Baryonyx in a 2017 conference abstract. Barker and colleagues stated that the recognition of the Wessex Formation specimens as new genera renders the presence of Baryonyx there ambiguous, and most of the previously assigned isolated material from the Wealden Supergroup is therefore indeterminate. These authors also found the Portuguese specimen ML 1190 to group with Baryonyx, supporting its original assignment to the genus.

Possible synonyms

In 2003, Milner noted that some teeth at the Natural History Museum previously identified as belonging to the genera Suchosaurus and Megalosaurus probably belonged to Baryonyx. The type species of Suchosaurus, S. cultridens, was named by the British biologist Richard Owen in 1841, based on teeth discovered by the British geologist Gideon A. Mantell in Tilgate Forest, Sussex. Owen originally thought the teeth to have belonged to a crocodile; he was yet to name the group Dinosauria, which happened the following year. A second species, S. girardi, was named by the French palaeontologist Henri Émile Sauvage in 1897, based on jaw fragments and a tooth from Boca do Chapim, Portugal. In 2007, the French palaeontologist Éric Buffetaut considered the teeth of S. girardi very similar to those of Baryonyx (and S. cultridens) except for the stronger development of the  flutes (or "ribs"; lengthwise ridges), suggesting that the remains belonged to the same genus. Buffetaut agreed with Milner that the teeth of S. cultridens were almost identical to those of B. walkeri, but with a ribbier surface. The former taxon might be a senior synonym of the latter (since it was published first), depending on whether the differences were within a taxon or between different ones. According to Buffetaut, since the holotype specimen of S. cultridens is a single tooth and that of B. walkeri is a skeleton, it would be more practical to retain the newer name. In 2011, Mateus and colleagues agreed that Suchosaurus was closely related to Baryonyx, but considered both species in the former genus nomina dubia (dubious names) since their holotype specimens were not considered diagnostic (lacking distinguishing features) and could not be definitely equated with other taxa. In any case, the identification of Suchosaurus as a spinosaurid makes it the first named member of the family.

In 1997, Charig and Milner noted that two fragmentary spinosaurid snouts from the Elrhaz Formation of Niger (reported by the French palaeontologist Philippe Taquet in 1984) were similar enough to Baryonyx that they considered them to belong to an indeterminate species of the genus (despite their much younger Aptian geological age). In 1998, these fossils became the basis of the genus and species Cristatusaurus lapparenti, named by Taquet and the American palaeontologist Dale Russell. The American palaeontologist Paul Sereno and colleagues named the new genus and species Suchomimus tenerensis later in 1998, based on more complete fossils from the Elrhaz Formation. In 2002, the German palaeontologist Hans-Dieter Sues and colleagues proposed that Suchomimus tenerensis was similar enough to Baryonyx walkeri to be considered a species within the same genus (as B. tenerensis), and that Suchomimus was identical to Cristatusaurus. Milner concurred that the material from Niger was indistinguishable from Baryonyx in 2003. In a 2004 conference abstract, Hutt and Newberry supported the synonymy based on a large theropod vertebra from the Isle of Wight which they attributed to an animal closely related to Baryonyx and Suchomimus. Later studies have kept Baryonyx and Suchomimus separate, whereas Cristatusaurus has been proposed to be either a nomen dubium or possibly distinct from both. A 2017 review paper by the Brazilian palaeontologist Carlos Roberto A. Candeiro and colleagues stated that this debate was more in the realm of semantics than science, as it is generally agreed that B. walkeri and S. tenerensis are distinct, related species. Barker and colleagues found Suchomimus to be closer related to the British genera Riparovenator and Ceratosuchops than to Baryonyx in 2021.

Description

The fact that elements of the skull and vertebral column of the B. walkeri holotype specimen (NHM R9951) do not appear to have co-ossified (fused) suggests that the individual was not fully grown, and the mature animal may have been much larger (as is the case for some other spinosaurids). On the other hand, the specimen's fused sternum indicates that it may have been mature.

Skull

The skull of Baryonyx is incompletely known, and much of the middle and hind portions are not preserved. It was elongated, and the front  of the premaxillae formed a long, narrow, and low snout (rostrum) with a smoothly rounded upper surface. The  (bony nostrils) were long, low, and placed far back from the snout tip. The front  of the snout expanded into a spatulate (spoon-like), "terminal rosette", a shape similar to the rostrum of the modern gharial. The front  of the lower margin of the premaxillae was downturned (or hooked), whereas that of the front portion of the maxillae was upturned. This morphology resulted in a sigmoid or S shaped margin of the lower upper tooth row, in which the teeth from the front of the maxilla were projecting forward. The snout was particularly narrow directly behind the rosette; this area received the large teeth of the mandible. A downturned premaxilla and a sigmoid lower margin of the upper tooth row was also present in distantly related theropods such as Dilophosaurus. The snout had extensive  (openings), which would have been exits for blood vessels and nerves, and the maxilla appears to have housed sinuses.

Baryonyx had a rudimentary , similar to crocodiles but unlike most theropod dinosaurs. A rugose (roughly wrinkled) surface suggests the presence of a horny pad in the roof of the mouth. The nasal bones were fused, which distinguished Baryonyx from other spinosaurids, and a sagittal crest was present above the eyes, on the upper mid-line of the nasals. This crest was triangular, narrow, and sharp in its front part, and was distinct from those of other spinosaurids in ending hind wards in a cross-shaped process. The lacrimal bone in front of the eye appears to have formed a horn core similar to those seen, for example, in Allosaurus, and was distinct from other spinosaurids in being solid and almost triangular. Sereno and colleagues suggested that some of Baryonyx cranial bones had been misidentified by Charig and Milner, resulting in the occiput being reconstructed as too deep, and that the skull was instead probably as low, long and narrow as that of Suchomimus. The front  of the dentary in the mandible sloped upwards towards the curve of the snout. The dentary was very long and shallow, with a prominent Meckelian groove on the inner side. The , where the two halves of the lower jaw connected at the front, was particularly short. The rest of the lower jaw was fragile; the hind third was much thinner than the front, with a blade-like appearance. The front part of the dentary curved outwards to accommodate the large front teeth, and this area formed the mandibular part of the rosette. The dentary–like the snout—had many foramina.

Most of the teeth found with the holotype specimen were not in articulation with the skull; a few remained in the upper jaw, and only small replacement teeth were still borne by the lower jaw. The teeth had the shape of recurved cones, where slightly flattened from sideways, and their curvature was almost uniform. The roots were very long, and tapered towards their extremity. The carinae (sharp front and back edges) of the teeth were finely serrated with denticles on the front and back, and extended all along the crown. There were around six to eight denticles per mm (0.039 in), a much larger number than in large-bodied theropods like Torvosaurus and Tyrannosaurus. Some of the teeth were fluted, with six to eight ridges along the length of their inner sides and fine-grained  (outermost layer of teeth), while others bore no flutes; their presence is probably related to position or ontogeny (development during growth). The inner side of each tooth row had a bony wall. The number of teeth was large compared to most other theropods, with six to seven teeth in each premaxilla and thirty-two in each dentary. Based on the closer packing and smaller size of the dentary teeth compared to those in the corresponding length of the premaxilla, the difference between the number of teeth in the upper and lower jaws appears to have been more pronounced than in other theropods. The terminal rosette in the upper jaw of the holotype had thirteen  (tooth sockets), six on the left and seven on the right side, showing tooth count asymmetry. The first four upper teeth were large (with the second and third the largest), while the fourth and fifth progressively decreased in size. The diameter of the largest was twice that of the smallest. The first four alveoli of the dentary (corresponding to the tip of the upper jaw) were the largest, with the rest more regular in size. Small subtriangular  were present between the alveoli.

Postcranial skeleton

Initially thought to have lacked the sigmoid curve typical of theropods, the neck of Baryonyx does appear to have formed an S shape, though straighter than in other theropods. The cervical vertebrae of the neck tapered towards the head and became progressively longer front to back. Their  (the processes that connected the vertebrae) were flat, and their  (processes to which neck muscles attached) were well developed. The  (the second neck vertebra) was small relative to the size of the skull and had a well-developed . The  were short, similar to those of crocodiles, and possibly overlapped each other somewhat. The centra of the dorsal vertebrae of the back were similar in size. From front to back, the neural spines of the dorsal vertebrae changed from short and stout to tall and broad. One isolated dorsal neural spine was moderately elongated and slender, indicating that Baryonyx may have had a hump or ridge along the centre of its back (though incipiently developed compared to those of other spinosaurids).

The coracoid tapered hind-wards when viewed in profile, and, uniquely among spinosaurids, connected with the scapula in a peg-and-notch articulation. The scapulae were robust and the bones of the forelimb were short in relation to the animal's size, but broad and sturdy. The radius was short, stout and straight, and less than half the length of the humerus, while the ulna was a little longer. The ulna had a powerful  and an expanded lower end. The hands had three fingers; the first finger bore a large claw measuring about  along its curve in the holotype specimen. The claw would have been lengthened by a keratin (horny) sheath in life. Apart from its size, the claw's proportions were fairly typical of a theropod, i.e. it was bilaterally symmetric, slightly compressed, smoothly rounded, and sharply pointed. A groove for the sheath ran along the length of the claw. The other claws of the hand were much smaller. The  (main hip bone) of the pelvis had a prominent , an anterior process that was slender and vertically expanded, and a posterior process that was long and straight. The ilium also had a prominent  and a deep grove that faced downwards. The  (the socket for the femur) was long from front to back. The  (lower and rearmost hip bone) had a well developed  at the upper part. The margin of the  blade at the lower end was turned outward, and the pubic foot was not expanded. The femur lacked a groove on the fibular condyle, and, uniquely among spinosaurids, the fibula had a very shallow fibular  (depression).

Classification
 
In their original description, Charig and Milner found Baryonyx unique enough to warrant a new family of theropod dinosaurs: Baryonychidae. They found Baryonyx to be unlike any other theropod group, and considered the possibility that it was a thecodont (a grouping of early archosaurs now considered unnatural), due to having apparently primitive features, but noted that the articulation of the maxilla and premaxilla was similar to that in Dilophosaurus. They also noted that the two snouts from Niger (which later became the basis of Cristatusaurus), assigned to the family Spinosauridae by Taquet in 1984, appeared almost identical to that of Baryonyx and they referred them to Baryonychidae instead. In 1988, the American palaeontologist Gregory S. Paul agreed with Taquet that Spinosaurus, described in 1915 based on fragmentary remains from Egypt that were destroyed in World War II, and Baryonyx were similar and (due to their kinked snouts) possibly late-surviving dilophosaurs. Buffetaut also supported this relationship in 1989. In 1990, Charig and Milner dismissed the spinosaurid affinities of Baryonyx, since they did not find their remains similar enough. In 1997, they agreed that Baryonychidae and Spinosauridae were related, but disagreed that the former name should become a synonym of the latter, because the completeness of Baryonyx compared to Spinosaurus made it a better type genus for a family, and because they did not find the similarities between the two significant enough. Holtz and colleagues listed Baryonychidae as a synonym of Spinosauridae in 2004.

Discoveries in the 1990s shed more light on the relationships of Baryonyx and its relatives. In 1996, a snout from Morocco was referred to Spinosaurus, and Irritator and Angaturama from Brazil (the two are possible synonyms) were named. Cristatusaurus and Suchomimus were named based on fossils from Niger in 1998. In their description of Suchomimus, Sereno and colleagues placed it and Baryonyx in the new subfamily Baryonychinae within Spinosauridae; Spinosaurus and Irritator were placed in the subfamily Spinosaurinae. Baryonychinae was distinguished by the small size and larger number of teeth in the dentary behind the terminal rosette, the deeply keeled front dorsal vertebrae, and by having serrated teeth. Spinosaurinae was distinguished by their straight tooth crowns without serrations, small first tooth in the premaxilla, increased spacing of teeth in the jaws, and possibly by having their nostrils placed further back and the presence of a deep neural spine sail. They also united the spinosaurids and their closest relatives in the superfamily Spinosauroidea, but in 2010, the British palaeontologist Roger Benson considered this a junior synonym of Megalosauroidea (an older name). In a 2007 conference abstract, the American palaeontologist Denver W. Fowler suggested that since Suchosaurus is the first named genus in its group, the clade names Spinosauroidea, Spinosauridae, and Baryonychinae should be replaced by Suchosauroidea, Suchosauridae, and Suchosaurinae, regardless of whether or not the name Baryonyx is retained. A 2017 study by the Brazilian palaeontologists Marcos A. F. Sales and Cesar L. Schultz found that the clade Baryonychinae was not well supported, since serrated teeth may be an ancestral trait among spinosaurids.

Barker and colleagues found support for a Baryonychinae-Spinosaurinae split in 2021, and the following cladogram shows the position of Baryonyx within Spinosauridae according to their study:

Evolution

Spinosaurids appear to have been widespread from the Barremian to the Cenomanian stages of the Cretaceous period, about 130 to 95 million years ago, while the oldest known spinosaurid remains date to the Middle Jurassic. They shared features such as long, narrow, crocodile-like skulls; sub-circular teeth, with fine to no serrations; the terminal rosette of the snout; and a secondary palate that made them more resistant to torsion. In contrast, the primitive and typical condition for theropods was a tall, narrow snout with blade-like (ziphodont) teeth with serrated carinae. The skull adaptations of spinosaurids converged with those of crocodilians; early members of the latter group had skulls similar to typical theropods, later developing elongated snouts, conical teeth, and secondary palates. These adaptations may have been the result of a dietary change from terrestrial prey to fish. Unlike crocodiles, the post-cranial skeletons of baryonychine spinosaurids do not appear to have aquatic adaptations. Sereno and colleagues proposed in 1998 that the large thumb-claw and robust forelimbs of spinosaurids evolved in the Middle Jurassic, before the elongation of the skull and other adaptations related to fish-eating, since the former features are shared with their megalosaurid relatives. They also suggested that the spinosaurines and baryonychines diverged before the Barremian age of the Early Cretaceous.

Several theories have been proposed about the biogeography of the spinosaurids. Since Suchomimus was more closely related to Baryonyx (from Europe) than to Spinosaurus—although that genus also lived in Africa—the distribution of spinosaurids cannot be explained as vicariance resulting from continental rifting. Sereno and colleagues proposed that spinosaurids were initially distributed across the supercontinent Pangea, but split with the opening of the Tethys Sea. Spinosaurines would then have evolved in the south (Africa and South America: in Gondwana) and baryonychines in the north (Europe: in Laurasia), with Suchomimus the result of a single north-to-south dispersal event. Buffetaut and the Tunisian palaeontologist Mohamed Ouaja also suggested in 2002 that baryonychines could be the ancestors of spinosaurines, which appear to have replaced the former in Africa. Milner suggested in 2003 that spinosaurids originated in Laurasia during the Jurassic, and dispersed via the Iberian land bridge into Gondwana, where they radiated. In 2007, Buffetaut pointed out that palaeogeographical studies had demonstrated that Iberia was near northern Africa during the Early Cretaceous, which he found to confirm Milner's idea that the Iberian region was a stepping stone between Europe and Africa, which is supported by the presence of baryonychines in Iberia. The direction of the dispersal between Europe and Africa is still unknown, and subsequent discoveries of spinosaurid remains in Asia and possibly Australia indicate that it may have been complex.

In 2016, the Spanish palaeontologist Alejandro Serrano-Martínez and colleagues reported the oldest known spinosaurid fossil, a tooth from the Middle Jurassic of Niger, which they found to suggest that spinosaurids originated in Gondwana, since other known Jurassic spinosaurid teeth are also from Africa, but they found the subsequent dispersal routes unclear. Some later studies instead suggested this tooth belonged to a megalosaurid. Candeiro and colleagues suggested in 2017 that spinosaurids of northern Gondwana were replaced by other predators, such as abelisauroids, since no definite spinosaurid fossils are known from after the Cenomanian anywhere in the world. They attributed the disappearance of spinosaurids and other shifts in the fauna of Gondwana to changes in the environment, perhaps caused by transgressions in sea level. Malafaia and colleagues stated in 2020 that Baryonyx remains the oldest unquestionable spinosaurid, while acknowledging that older remains had also been tentatively assigned to the group. Barker and colleagues found support for a European origin for spinosaurids in 2021, with an expansion to Asia and Gondwana during the first half of the Early Cretaceous. In contrast to Sereno, these authors suggested there had been at least two dispersal events from Europe to Africa, leading to Suchomimus and the African part of Spinosaurinae.

Palaeobiology

Diet and feeding
In 1986, Charig and Milner suggested that its elongated snout with many finely serrated teeth indicated that Baryonyx was piscivorous (fish-eating), speculating that it crouched on a riverbank and used its claw to gaff fish out of the water (similar to the modern grizzly bear). Two years earlier, Taquet pointed out that the spinosaurid snouts from Niger were similar to those of the modern gharial and suggested a behaviour similar to herons or storks. In 1987, the Scottish biologist Andrew Kitchener disputed the piscivorous behaviour of Baryonyx and suggested that it would have been a scavenger, using its long neck to feed on the ground, its claws to break into a carcass, and its long snout (with nostrils far back for breathing) for investigating the body cavity. Kitchener argued that Baryonyx jaws and teeth were too weak to kill other dinosaurs and too heavy to catch fish, with too many adaptations for piscivory. According to the Irish palaeontologist Robin E. H. Reid, a scavenged carcass would have been broken up by its predator and large animals capable of doing so—such as grizzly bears—are also capable of catching fish (at least in shallow water).

In 1997, Charig and Milner demonstrated direct dietary evidence in the stomach region of the B. walkeri holotype. It contained the first evidence of piscivory in a theropod dinosaur, acid-etched scales and teeth of the common fish Scheenstia mantelli (then classified in the genus Lepidotes), and abraded or etched bones of a young iguanodontid. They also presented circumstantial evidence for piscivory, such as crocodile-like adaptations for catching and swallowing prey: long, narrow jaws with their "terminal rosette", similar to those of a gharial, and the downturned tip and notch of the snout. In their view, these adaptations suggested that Baryonyx would have caught small to medium-sized fish in the manner of a crocodilian: gripping them with the notch of the snout (giving the teeth a "stabbing function"), tilting the head backwards, and swallowing them headfirst. Larger fish would be broken up with the claws. That the teeth in the lower jaw were smaller, more crowded and numerous than those in the upper jaw may have helped the animal grip food. Charig and Milner maintained that Baryonyx would primarily have eaten fish (although it would also have been an active predator and opportunistic scavenger), but it was not equipped to be a macro-predator like Allosaurus. They suggested that Baryonyx mainly used its forelimbs and large claws to catch, kill and tear apart larger prey. An apparent gastrolith (gizzard stone) was also found with the specimen. The German palaeontologist Oliver Wings suggested in 2007 that the low number of stones found in theropods like Baryonyx and Allosaurus could have been ingested by accident. In 2004, a pterosaur neck vertebra from Brazil with a spinosaurid tooth embedded in it reported by Buffetaut and colleagues confirmed that the latter were not exclusively piscivorous.

A 2005 beam-theory study by the Canadian palaeontologist François Therrien and colleagues was unable to reconstruct force profiles of Baryonyx, but found that the related Suchomimus would have used the front part of its jaws to capture prey, and suggested that the jaws of spinosaurids were adapted for hunting smaller terrestrial prey in addition to fish. They envisaged that spinosaurids could have captured smaller prey with the rosette of teeth at the front of the jaws, and finished it by shaking it. Larger prey would instead have been captured and killed with their forelimbs instead of their bite, since their skulls would not be able to resist the bending stress. They also agreed that the conical teeth of spinosaurids were well-developed for impaling and holding prey, with their shape enabling them to withstand bending loads from all directions. A 2007 finite element analysis of CT scanned snouts by the British palaeontologist Emily J. Rayfield and colleagues indicated that the biomechanics of Baryonyx were most similar to those of the gharial and unlike those of the American alligator and more-conventional theropods, supporting a piscivorous diet for spinosaurids. Their secondary palate helped them resist bending and torsion of their tubular snouts. A 2013 beam-theory study by the British palaeontologists Andrew R. Cuff and Rayfield compared the biomechanics of CT-scanned spinosaurid snouts with those of extant crocodilians, and found the snouts of Baryonyx and Spinosaurus similar in their resistance to bending and torsion. Baryonyx was found to have relatively high resistance in the snout to dorsoventral bending compared with Spinosaurus and the gharial. The authors concluded (in contrast to the 2007 study) that Baryonyx performed differently than the gharial; spinosaurids were not exclusive piscivores, and their diet was determined by their individual size.

In a 2014 conference abstract, the American palaeontologist Danny Anduza and Fowler pointed out that grizzly bears do not gaff fish out of the water as was suggested for Baryonyx, and also ruled out that the dinosaur would not have darted its head like herons, since the necks of spinosaurids were not strongly S-curved, and their eyes were not well-positioned for binocular vision. Instead, they suggested the jaws would have made sideways sweeps to catch fish, like the gharial, with the hand claws probably used to stamp down and impale large fish, whereafter they manipulated them with their jaws, in a manner similar to grizzly bears and fishing cats. They did not find the teeth of spinosaurids suitable for dismembering prey, due to their lack of serrations, and suggested they would have swallowed prey whole (while noting they could also have used their claws for dismemberment). A 2016 study by the Belgian palaeontologist Christophe Hendrickx and colleagues found that adult spinosaurs could displace their mandibular rami (halves of the lower jaw) sideways when the jaw was depressed, which allowed the pharynx (opening that connects the mouth to the oesophagus) to be widened. This jaw-articulation is similar to that seen in pterosaurs and living pelicans, and would likewise have allowed spinosaurids to swallow large prey such as fish and other animals. They also reported that the possible Portuguese Baryonyx fossils were found associated with isolated Iguanodon teeth, and listed it along with other such associations as support for opportunistic feeding behaviour in spinosaurs. Another 2016 study by the French palaeontologist Romain Vullo and colleagues found that the jaws of spinosaurids were convergent with those of pike conger eels; these fish also have jaws that are compressed side to side (whereas the jaws of crocodilians are compressed from top to bottom), an elongated snout with a "terminal rosette" that bears enlarged teeth, and a notch behind the rosette with smaller teeth. Such jaws likely evolved for grabbing prey in aquatic environments with low light, and may have helped in prey detection.

Motion and aquatic habits

In their original description, Charig and Milner did not consider Baryonyx to be aquatic (due to its nostrils being on the sides of its snout—far from the tip—and the form of the post-cranial skeleton), but thought it was capable of swimming, like most land vertebrates. They speculated that the elongated skull, long neck, and strong humerus of Baryonyx indicated that the animal was a facultative quadruped, unique among theropods. In their 1997 article they found no skeletal support for this, but maintained that the forelimbs would have been strong enough for a quadrupedal posture and it would probably have caught aquatic prey while crouching—or on all fours—near (or in) water. A 2014 re-description of Spinosaurus by the German-Moroccan palaeontologist Nizar Ibrahim and colleagues based on new remains suggested that it was a quadruped, based on its anterior centre of body mass. The authors found quadrupedality unlikely for Baryonyx, since the better-known legs of the closely related Suchomimus did not support this posture. Various theories have been proposed for the tall neural spines (or "sails") of spinosaurids, such as use in thermoregulation, fat-storage in a hump, or display, and in 2015, the German biophysicist Jan Gimsa and colleagues suggested that this feature could also have aided aquatic movement by improving manoeuvrability when submerged, and acted as fulcrum for powerful movements of the neck and tail (similar to those of sailfish or thresher sharks).

In 2017, the British palaeontologist David E. Hone and Holtz hypothesized that the head crests of spinosaurids were probably used for sexual or threat display. The authors also pointed out that (like other theropods) there was no reason to believe that the forelimbs of Baryonyx were able to pronate (crossing the radius and ulna bones of the lower arm to turn the hand), and thereby make it able to rest or walk on its palms. Resting on or using the forelimbs for locomotion may have been possible (as indicated by tracks of a resting theropod), but if this was the norm, the forelimbs would probably have showed adaptations for this. Hone and Holtz furthermore suggested that the forelimbs of spinosaurids do not seem optimal for trapping prey, but instead appear similar to the forelimbs of digging animals. They suggested that the ability to dig would have been useful when excavating nests, digging for water, or to reach some kinds of prey. Hone and Holtz also believed that spinosaurids would have waded and dipped in water rather than submerging themselves, due to their sparsity of aquatic adaptations. A 2018 study of buoyancy (through simulation with 3D models) by the Canadian palaeontologist Donald M. Henderson found that distantly related theropods floated as well as the tested spinosaurs, and instead supported they would have stayed by the shorelines or shallow water rather than being semi-aquatic.

 
A 2010 study by the French palaeontologist Romain Amiot and colleagues proposed that spinosaurids were semiaquatic, based on the oxygen isotope composition of spinosaurid teeth from around the world compared with that of other theropods and extant animals. Spinosaurids probably spent much of the day in water, like crocodiles and hippopotamuses, and had a diet similar to the former; both were opportunistic predators. Since most spinosaurids do not appear to have anatomical adaptations for an aquatic lifestyle, the authors proposed that submersion in water was a means of thermoregulation similar to that of crocodiles and hippopotamuses. Spinosaurids may also have turned to aquatic habitats and piscivory to avoid competition with large, more-terrestrial theropods. In 2016, Sales and colleagues statistically examined the fossil distribution of spinosaurids, abelisaurids, and carcharodontosaurids, and concluded that spinosaurids had the strongest support for association with coastal palaeoenvironments. Spinosaurids also appear to have inhabited inland environments (with their distribution there being comparable to carcharodontosaurids), which indicates they may have been more generalist than usually thought.

Sales and Schultz agreed in 2017 that spinosaurids were semiaquatic and partially piscivorous, based on skull features such as conical teeth, snouts that were compressed from side to side, and retracted nostrils. They interpreted the fact that histological data indicates some spinosaurids were more terrestrial than others as reflecting ecological niche partitioning among them. As some spinosaurids have smaller nostrils than others, their olfactory abilities were presumably lesser, as in modern piscivorous animals, and they may instead have used other senses (such as vision and mechanoreception) when hunting fish. Olfaction may have been more useful for spinosaurids that also fed on terrestrial prey, such as baryonychines. A 2018 study by the French palaeontologist Auguste Hassler and colleagues of calcium isotopes in the teeth of North African theropods found that spinosaurids had a mixed diet of fish and herbivorous dinosaurs, whereas the other theropods examined (abelisaurids and carcharodontosaurids) mainly fed on herbivorous dinosaurs. This indicates ecological partitioning between these theropods, and that spinosaurids were semi-aquatic predators.

A 2017 histological study of growth lines by the German palaeontologist Katja Waskow and Mateus found that the possible Portuguese Baryonyx specimen had died between the age of 23 and 25 years old, and was close to its maximum size and skeletal maturity. This contradicted a younger age indicated by the neurocentral sutures not being fused, and the presence of both mature and sub-adult traits may be due to paedomorphosis (where juvenile traits are retained into adulthood). Paedomorphic traits may be related to swimming locomotion, as they have been suggested in other extinct animals thought to have been aquatic (such as plesiosaurs and temnospondyls). The study also found that the animal had reached sexual maturity at the age of 13 to 15 years, due to a decrease in growth rate at this point. 

A 2022 study revealed that Baryonyx possessed dense bones that would have allowed it to dive underwater. This same adaptation was revealed in the related Spinosaurus, and they are believed to have been subaqueous foragers that dived after aquatic prey, while Suchomimus was better adapted to a non-diving lifestyle by comparison according to the provided analysis. This discovery also showcases the unique and ecologically disparate lifestyles spinosaurids had, with more hollow-boned genera preferring to hunt in shallower water.

Palaeoenvironment

The Weald Clay Formation consists of sediments of Hauterivian (Lower Weald Clay) to Barremian (Upper Weald Clay) age, about 130–125 million years old. The B. walkeri holotype was found in the latter, in clay representing non-marine still water, which has been interpreted as a fluvial or mudflat environment with shallow water, lagoons, and marshes. During the Early Cretaceous, the Weald area of Surrey, Sussex, and Kent was partly covered by the large, fresh-to-brackish water Wealden Lake. Two large rivers drained the northern area (where London now stands), flowing into the lake through a river delta; the Anglo-Paris Basin was in the south. Its climate was sub-tropical, similar to the present Mediterranean region. Since the Smokejacks Pit consists of different stratigraphic levels, fossil taxa found there are not necessarily contemporaneous. Dinosaurs from the locality include the ornithopods Mantellisaurus, Iguanodon, and small sauropods. Other vertebrates from the Weald Clay include crocodiles, pterosaurs, lizards (such as Dorsetisaurus), amphibians, sharks (such as Hybodus), and bony fishes (including Scheenstia). Members of ten orders of insects have been identified, including Valditermes, Archisphex, and Pterinoblattina. Other invertebrates include ostracods, isopods, conchostracans, and bivalves. The plants Weichselia and the aquatic, herbaceous Bevhalstia were common. Other plants found include ferns, horsetails, club mosses, and conifers.

 
Other dinosaurs from the Wessex Formation of the Isle of Wight where Baryonyx may have occurred include the theropods Riparovenator, Ceratosuchops, Neovenator, Eotyrannus, Aristosuchus, Thecocoelurus, Calamospondylus, and Ornithodesmus; the ornithopods Iguanodon, Hypsilophodon, and Valdosaurus; the sauropods Ornithopsis, Eucamerotus, and Chondrosteosaurus; and the ankylosaur Polacanthus. Barker and colleagues stated in 2021 that the identification of the two additional spinosaurids from the Wealden Supergroup, Riparovenator and Ceratosuchops, has implications for potential ecological separation within Spinosauridae if these and Baryonyx were contemporary and interacted. They cautioned that it is possible the Upper Weald Clay and Wessex Formations and the spinosaurids known from them were separated in time. It is generally thought that large predators occur with small taxonomic diversity in any area due to ecological demands, yet many Mesozoic assemblages include two or more sympatric theropods that were comparable in size and morphology, and this also appears to have been the case for spinosaurids. Barker and colleagues suggested that high diversity within Spinosauridae in a given area may have been the result of environmental circumstances benefiting their niche. While it has been generally assumed that only identifiable anatomical traits related to resource partitioning allowed for coexistence of large theropods, Barker and colleagues noted that this does not preclude that similar and closely related taxa could coexist and overlap in ecological requirements. Possible miche partitioning could be in time (seasonal or daily), in space (between habitats in the same ecosystems), or depending on conditions, and they could also have been separated by their choice of habitat within their regions (which may have ranged in climate).

Taphonomy

Charig and Milner presented a possible scenario explaining the taphonomy (changes during decay and fossilisation) of the B. walkeri holotype specimen. The fine-grained sediments around the skeleton, and the fact that the bones were found close together (skull and forelimb elements at one end of the excavation area and the pelvis and hind-limb elements at the other), indicates that the environment was quiet at the time of deposition, and water currents did not carry the carcass far—possibly because the water was shallow. The area where the specimen died seems to have been suitable for a piscivorous animal. It may have caught fish and scavenged on the mud plain, becoming mired before it died and was buried. Since the bones are well-preserved and had no gnaw marks, the carcass appears to have been undisturbed by scavengers (suggesting that it was quickly covered by sediment).

The disarticulation of the bones may have been the result of soft-tissue decomposition. Parts of the skeleton seem to have weathered to different degrees, perhaps because water levels changed or the sediments shifted (exposing parts of the skeleton). The girdle and limb bones, the dentary, and a rib were broken before fossilisation, perhaps from trampling by large animals while buried. Most of the tail appears to have been lost before fossilisation, perhaps due to scavenging, or having rotted and floated off. The orientation of the bones indicates that the carcass lay on its back (perhaps tilted slightly to the left, with the right side upwards), which may explain why all the lower teeth had fallen out of their sockets and some upper teeth were still in place.

References

External links
 Natural History Museum – "Baryonyx: the discovery of an amazing fish-eating dinosaur" – four minute video presented by Angela C. Milner

Spinosaurids
Monotypic dinosaur genera
Barremian life
Early Cretaceous dinosaurs of Europe
Cretaceous England
Fossils of England
Fossil taxa described in 1986
Taxa named by Alan J. Charig
Taxa named by Angela Milner
Articles containing video clips